North and South may refer to:

Literature
 North and South (Gaskell novel), an 1854 novel by Elizabeth Gaskell
 North and South (trilogy), a series of novels by John Jakes (1982–1987)
 North and South (Jakes novel), first novel in the series
 North & South, a 1946 poetry collection by Elizabeth Bishop
 Avatar: The Last Airbender – North and South, a 2016–2017 graphic novel trilogy

Magazines
 North & South (New Zealand magazine), a New Zealand current affairs magazine
 North & South (US magazine), a magazine devoted to the American Civil War

Television and movies 
 North and South (miniseries), a 1985 and later miniseries based on the novels of John Jakes
 North & South (TV serial), a 2004 BBC TV adaptation of Elizabeth Gaskell's novel with Richard Armitage as John Thornton
 North/South, a 2006 CBC television series
 North-South, or Four Buddies and the Bride, a 2015 Armenian comedy

Music 
 North & South, a late 1990s boyband who starred in the television series No Sweat
 North and South (album), an album by Gerry Rafferty and a song on the album
 "North and South", a song by the Clash from Cut the Crap

Sport
 Golf tournaments at Pinehurst Resort, North Carolina, U.S.A.:
 North and South Open, 1902–1951
 North and South Men's Amateur Golf Championship, staged annually since 1901
 North and South Women's Amateur Golf Championship, staged annually since 1902

Video games 
 North & South (computer game), a 1989 strategy title focusing on the American Civil War for multiple formats
 The Bluecoats: North vs South, a 2012 video game by Microïds for iPod touch/iPhone/iPad

Orientation (geometry) 
 Two of the four cardinal directions
 A line of longitude
 A vertical circle in astronomy

Other 
 North and South Railway, defunct American railroad
 "North and South", rhyming slang for the mouth
 North–south position, ground grappling position
 North–south, a pattern of computer network traffic between client and server; compare to east-west
 North–South divide in the World, a socio-economic and political division between "North" developed countries and "South" developing countries
 North vs. South: The Great American Civil War, 1999 video game